Platypalpus impexus is a species of hybotid dance fly in the family Hybotidae.

References

Further reading

External links

 

Hybotidae